Edward W. Whitson was a member of the Wisconsin State Assembly.

Biography
Whitson was born on Long Island in New York City on April 1, 1849. He moved with his parents to Wisconsin in 1851. In 1882, he married Anna D. Jones. They later moved to Merrill, Wisconsin. Whitson was a Congregationalist.

Career
Whitson was elected to the Assembly in 1902. Previously, he had been elected Mayor of Tomahawk, Wisconsin in 1874. He was a Republican.

References

External links
The Political Graveyard

People from Long Island
People from Tomahawk, Wisconsin
American Congregationalists
20th-century Congregationalists
Republican Party members of the Wisconsin State Assembly
Mayors of places in Wisconsin
1849 births
Year of death missing
People from Merrill, Wisconsin